The Rio Piranhas Formation is a Berriasian to Hauterivian geologic formation in Paraíba, Brazil. Fossil ornithopod tracks have been reported from the formation. Also fossils of Triunfosaurus leonardii have been found in the formation.

See also 
 List of dinosaur-bearing rock formations
 List of stratigraphic units with ornithischian tracks
 Ornithopod tracks

References

Bibliography

Further reading 
 I. S. Carvalho, L. Salgado, R. M. Lindoso, H. I. Araújo-Júnior, F. C. Costa Nogueira and J. A. Soares. 2017. A new basal titanosaur (Dinosauria, Sauropoda) from the Lower Cretaceous of Brazil. Journal of South American Earth Sciences 75:74-84
 ANP - Brazil Round 9 - Rio do Peixe Basin

Geologic formations of Brazil
Cretaceous Brazil
Berriasian Stage
Hauterivian Stage
Sandstone formations
Alluvial deposits
Ichnofossiliferous formations
Fossiliferous stratigraphic units of South America
Paleontology in Brazil
Formations